Tryptase alpha-1 and tryptase beta-1 are enzymes that in humans are encoded by the same TPSAB1 gene.  Beta tryptases appear to be the main isoenzymes expressed in mast cells; whereas in basophils, alpha tryptases predominate.

Function 

Tryptases comprise a family of trypsin-like serine proteases, the peptidase family S1. Tryptases are enzymatically active only as heparin-stabilized tetramers, and they are resistant to all known endogenous proteinase inhibitors. Several tryptase genes are clustered on chromosome 16p13.3. These genes are characterized by several distinct features. They have a highly conserved 3' UTR and contain tandem repeat sequences at the 5' flank and 3' UTR which are thought to play a role in regulation of the mRNA stability. These genes have an intron immediately upstream of the initiator Met codon, which separates the site of transcription initiation from protein coding sequence. This feature is characteristic of tryptases but is unusual in other genes. The alleles of this gene exhibit an unusual amount of sequence variation, such that the alleles were once thought to represent two separate genes, alpha and beta 1.Tryptases have been implicated as mediators in the pathogenesis of asthma and other allergic and inflammatory disorders.

References

Further reading

EC 3.4.21